Albert Scherrer (28 February 1908 in Riehen – 5 July 1986 in Basel) was a racing driver from Switzerland.  He participated in one Formula One World Championship Grand Prix, the 1953 Swiss Grand Prix. He finished 16 laps down and unclassified, scoring no championship points.

Complete Formula One World Championship results
(key)

Swiss racing drivers
Swiss Formula One drivers
Hersham and Walton Motors Formula One drivers
1908 births
1986 deaths
People from Riehen
Sportspeople from Basel-Stadt